Guillermo Héctor Álvarez Cuevas (born 8 September 1945), better known as Billy Álvarez, is the former general director of La Cooperativa La Cruz Azul S.C.L., former president of the Mexican football club Cruz Azul, former footballer, and wanted fugitive. Álvarez Cuevas is currently wanted by Interpol in 195 countries on various crimes including multiple accounts of racketeering, money laundering, and extortion. As of September 2021, his whereabouts remain unknown.

He is the son of Guillermo Álvarez Macías who was the founder and first general director of the Cruz Azul cooperative.

Early life
Guillermo Héctor Álvarez Cuevas was born on 8 September 1945, to Guillermo Álvarez Macías and María del Carmen Cuevas Saldaña in the town of Jasso, Hidalgo. Álvarez Cuevas is the eldest of 3 siblings: Jose Alfredo, María del Carmen and María Gilda.

Álvarez briefly played professional football at Cruz Azul Hidalgo as a forward in 1976.

Career 
In 1986, Álvarez became president of the football club Cruz Azul. He was later appointed chairman of Cooperativa La Cruz Azul S.C.L on 1 July 1988.

Criminal Indictments
On 28 May 2020, the Unidad de Inteligencia Financiera froze the financial accounts of Álvarez, his brother José Alfredo Álvarez, and ex-vice president of Cruz Azul Víctor Manuel Garcés, citing money laundering and financial ties to shell companies worth over 300 million pesos (approx. US$15 million). Their investigation suggested between 2013 and 2020, 1.2 billion Mexican pesos (US$60.6 million) were transferred from the Cruz Azul Cooperative into personal offshore bank accounts, namely in the U.S. and Spain.

On 26 July 2020, the Attorney General of Mexico, Alejandro Gertz Manero, issued an arrest warrant for Álvarez and Garcés for ties with criminal organizations. Arrest warrants were also issued for directors of the Cruz Azul Cooperative Miguel Eduardo Borrell, Mario Sánchez Álvarez, and  Ángel Martín Junquera.

Cruz Azul faced disaffiliation from the Mexican Football Federation as a result of Álvarez's legal issues. He resigned as the general manager of the co-operative and subsequently stepped down as president of the football club on 1 August 2020, after 32 years as acting president. Jamie Ordiales was then appointed as the co-operative's general manager and the club's president.

Personal life
Álvarez Cuevas's daughter, Mónica Álvarez Álvarez, died of brain cancer at the age of 24 on 16 December 2010.

References

1945 births
20th-century Mexican businesspeople
21st-century Mexican businesspeople
Financial scandals
Footballers from Hidalgo (state)
Living people
Fugitives wanted by Mexico
Mexican money launderers
Mexican businesspeople
Association footballers not categorized by position
Mexican footballers